Niger Air Base 201 (also known in some sources as "Nigerien Air Base 201") is a United States drone airbase near Agadez, Niger.

The base is about 5 km southeast of Agadez. It is owned by the Nigerien military but built and paid for by the United States. It is operated by the U.S. military as a drone base. As of February 2018, the site consists of a runway, still under construction, a hangar, and numerous smaller buildings for personnel to work and live in.

Operations
The U.S. military presence at Base 201 began on April 19, 2016. Once complete, the runway will be big enough to accommodate both General Atomics MQ-9 Reaper armed drones as well as the much larger Boeing C-17 Globemaster III transport airplanes. Construction was scheduled to be completed by the end of 2018. However, delays have pushed the completion estimate to mid-2019. Runway construction is being undertaken by the 31st Expeditionary Rapid Engineer Deployable Heavy Operational Repair Squadron Engineers.

In July 2019, the 409th Air Expeditionary Group and the 411th Civil Affairs Battalion are stationed at the base.

ISR flights officially began on November 1, 2019.

Construction
The amount of US$50 million was approved by Congress for the base, but the cost may end up exceeding $100 million. The base was originally planned to be operational by the end of 2018, but delays have caused the completion date of the base to be pushed to mid-2019. The Air Base was described by U.S. officials as the largest construction project led by the United States Air Force. A report by the Department of Defense Inspector General criticized the project for skirting congressional oversight, failing to complete an adequate site survey, and not constructing the base to meet safety, security, and other technical requirements, findings that were disputed by the Air Force and U.S. Africa Command.

See also

 List of United States drone bases
 Mano Dayak International Airport
 Operation Juniper Shield - Niger

References

External links 
 Online BBC press article: War in the desert – Why the Sahara is terror's new front line. By Firle Davies & Alastair Leithead. Published 21 June 2018 on BBC.co.uk
 PBS NewsHour published on April 16, 2019

Airports in Niger
Military installations of the United States
Agadez Region
Military of Niger